Ambrosius Bosschaert II (1609–1645) was a Dutch Golden Age painter who specialized in flower paintings in the manner of his father Ambrosius Bosschaert.

Biography
Bosschaert was born in Middelburg.  According to the RKD his works are confused with those of his father, mostly because he painted in a similar style and signed with the same monograph. He was also heavily influenced by his uncle Balthasar van der Ast. His brothers Johannes Bosschaert and Abraham Bosschaert also became flower painters.  He died in Utrecht.

References

Ambrosius Bosschaert II on Artnet

1609 births
1645 deaths
Dutch Golden Age painters
Dutch male painters
Painters from Middelburg
Flower artists